Sofia Lexi Jacqueline Frank is a Filipino-American figure skater. She has competed in the free skate segment of the  2022 Four Continents Championships and the 2022 World Junior Figure Skating Championships.

Early life and education
Sofia Lexi Jacqueline Frank was born on October 6, 2005, in Los Angeles, United States. She is the third child of former Filipino beauty queen Precious Tongko, who was crowned 1990 Binibining Pilipinas Maja International, and Noah Frank, an American. Because of her commitments as an athlete, she attends Cheyenne High School's elite athlete track program.

Career

Early years
Frank was introduced to skating at the age of three, with her family later moving to Colorado Springs, Colorado to be able to train at the World Arena.

2021–2022 season
Having previously represented the United States, Frank began to compete for the Philippines in 2021.  

At the 2021 CS Nebelhorn Trophy, Frank attempted but failed to qualify for the 2022 Winter Olympics, placing twenty-fourth overall. Her results allowed her to qualify for the 2022 Four Continents Championships. 

In October, Frank placed eighteenth at the Finlandia Trophy, becoming the Philippines' highest scorer in the short program, free skate, and overall for a female skater. She scored 53.30 points in the short program and 94.79 points in the free skate for a total of 148.09 points. As a result, she broke the national record previously held by Alisson Perticheto, who had posted an overall score of 139.70 at the 2019 ISU Challenger Series Warsaw Cup. Frank then ranked fifth at the 2021 Tallinn Trophy the following month.

Competing at the junior level, Frank qualified for the 2022 World Junior Figure Skating Championships after finishing thirteenth at the 15th Santa Claus Cup in Hungary. 

In January, Frank participated at the  2022 Four Continents Championships in Tallinn, Estonia, where she placed sixteenth overall. She finished twenty-second at the 2022 World Junior Championships to end the season.

2022–2023 season
Sofia Lexi Jacqueline Frank is the 2022 Philippine National Senior Ladies Figure Skating Champion.  The national competition was held in SM Mall of Asia Ice Rink last December 19-20, 2022.
Frank won the gold medal in the 2022 Asian Open Figure Skating Trophy in Jakarta, Indonesia.

Programs

Competitive highlights
CS: Challenger Series

For the United States

Detailed results

Small medals for short and free programs awarded only at ISU Championships. ISU personal bests highlighted in bold.

References

2005 births
American female single skaters
Filipino female single skaters
American people of Filipino descent
Living people
Sportspeople from Los Angeles
Figure skaters from Colorado Springs, Colorado